The National Security Guard (NSG), commonly known as Black Cats, is a counter-terrorism unit of India under the Ministry of Home Affairs. It was founded on 16 October 1984, following Operation Blue Star, for combating terrorist activities and protect states against internal disturbances. Formalised in the Parliament of India under the National Security Guard Act, 1986. It is one of the seven Central Armed Police Forces of India.

Mission

The National Security Guard states its mission as:

"Train, equip and keep in readiness a special force capable of swiftly and effectively combating terrorism to live up to its motto Sarvatra Sarvottam Suraksha"

The NSG is a 'Federal Contingency Deployment Force' to tackle all facets of terrorism in the country. As a specialised counter-terrorism force, it is intended to be used "only in exceptional situations" and is not meant to take over the "functions of the State Police Forces or other Para Military Forces". Yet, over the years its role has been expanded to provide personal security to influential politicians regardless of the real threat that they face.

However, in January 2020, the NSG was withdrawn from this task of VIP security to ensure its focus on its original roles as an elite counter-terrorism and anti-hijacking force.

The NSG is trained to conduct counter-terrorist tasks, including countering hijackings on the land, sea, and air; bomb disposal (search, detection, and neutralisation of IEDs); PBI (Post Blast Investigation) and Hostage Rescue missions.

Directors General 
M A Ganapathy (DOB: 01-03-1964) is an Indian Police Service officer of the 1986 batch of Uttarakhand cadre, now serving as the Director General, National Security Guard w.e.f. 18-03-2021. He has previously served as Director General of Bureau of Civil Aviation Security and Director General of Police, Uttarakhand.

Organisation
According to the NSG website, it is modelled on the British Special Air Service as well as Germany's GSG 9 (Grenzschutzgruppe 9 or "Border Guard Group 9").

Headquarters 
 At Mehram Nagar, Palam 
Administration  The Director-General is assisted by four Indian Police Service officers for administrative matters of whom two are Inspectors General each for Administration and Headquarters (HQ) who in turn are assisted by Deputy Inspectors General. The Financial Advisor of the NSG has been an officer of the rank of Joint Secretary from Central Accounts Services and is assisted by Dy Financial Advisors. At Manesar 
Operation and training:    A Major General of the Indian Army, on deputation, designated as Inspector General (operations), is responsible for the planning and conduct of operations. Training is under another Inspector General (Training), located in Manesar, Gurgaon. They are further assisted by two DIGs – DIG (Operations) and DIG (Training). The strength of the NSG is estimated to be about 7000+ personnel. Air transport to support NSG is located at Indira Gandhi Airport.

Special Action Group (SAG)

There are 2 Special Action Groups – 51 and 52 SAGs. Both, along with 11 SRG, constitute the counter terrorist force (CTF) which is the counter-terrorist arm of NSG. 51 SAG along with 11 SRG are tasked for counter-terrorist and counter insurgency operations while 52 SAG deal with anti-hijacking operations. While SAG members are drawn from the Indian Army, SRG members are largely drawn from CAPFs.

Special Ranger Group (SRG)
There are 3 Special Ranger Groups (SRG) – 11,12 and 13.  11 SRG is under counter terrorist force (CTF) and is used purely for counter terrorist operations along with 51 SAG. 
SRG members are drawn both from the border guarding forces like BSF, ITBP and SSB and Internal Security Forces such as CRPF, CISF and Assam Rifles. In recent times GoI has decided to remove SRGs from protection duties and re-orient them exclusively for the mandate of NSG like SAG and 11 SRG.

Special Composite Group (SCG)
NSG has set five regional hubs under regional deployment. SCG consists of personnel both from Army and CAPFs for counter-terror operations within their area of responsibility. Each SCG is headed by an officer of rank colonel from the Indian Army on deputation as Group Commander. The five regional hubs are
26 SCG Mumbai
27 SCG Chennai
28 SCG Hyderabad
29 SCG Kolkata
30 SCG Gandhinagar

Electronic Support Group (ESG)
The electronic support group stationed at Manesar, provides communication and technological support. The group is headed by a Group Commander level officer on deputation.

National Bomb Data Centre

The National Bomb Data Centre (NBDC) was established in the year 1988 and redefined its role in the year 2000. NBDC was assigned the role of monitoring, recording and analyzing all bombing incidents in the country. It also records and analyses various bombing incidents across the world to gain expertise knowledge in bombing and related incidents to effectively counter such situations and shares information with relevant security agencies. NBDC also performs research and development in the field of explosives engineering. At present NBDC act as a nodal agency for all bombing related facets in the country. It is headed by a Group Commander who can be either from the Army or para military force. The current Group Commander is a Commandant rank officer from CRPF.

Regional deployment
In response to the criticism, due to the time taken by NSG units to arrive in November 2008 Mumbai attacks, from its base in Manesar, Haryana, the MHA decided to deploy NSG contingents in major regions across India.

Hyderabad
NSG hub is the regional hub of the National Security Guard and it's commando training is located near Hyderabad, Telangana, India. With the Ministry of Home Affairs (MHA) giving its nod and sanctioning  in 2017, the National Security Guard (NSG) officials geared up to establish the Southern Regional Center (SRC) at Ibrahimpatnam, Hyderabad for training commandos. It will be home to 300 black cat commandoes and is tasked with tackling any terror threat in the four states of Andhra Pradesh, Telangana, Odisha and Chhattisgarh.

The Hyderabad hub of 28 Special Composite Group (SCG) of the NSG is among the four regional hubs in the country. By 2018, 300 commandos were stationed at the NSG hub at Trimulgherry.

The state has two trained anti-terror striking forces. Besides the NSG, the Telangana Police's counter-terrorist group, OCTOPUS, also has a training facility in the same neighbourhood at Ibrahimpatnam, that has a strength of over 250 personnel.

NSG and OCTOPUS personnel undergo a gruelling training, including handling sophisticated weapons, after which commandos are sent back to their parent department when they reach the age of 35, ensuring that the force remains young and fighting fit.

Planning in Hyderabad

As of 2013, the proposal to set up a state-of-the-art NSG training centre at Ibrahimpatnam on the lines of NSG Manesar training centre had been pending for over three years. But the MHA officials, in their annual report released recently, announced the release of funds for developing infrastructure. "Post the 26/11 Mumbai terror strike, four regional hubs of NSG were operationalised in Mumbai, Hyderabad, Chennai and Kolkata to reduce reaction time. MHA has conveyed sanction of  towards the construction of this Southern Regional Centre, NSG at Ibrahimpatnam," the MHA report said.

Trimulgherry
Hyderabad would have an NSG hub at Trimulgherry as well as the SRC for training 'Black Cats'. As of now, nearly 300 commandos, ready for anti-terror operations round-the-clock, are stationed at the NSG hub at Trimulgherry.

Kolkata 
On 1 March 2020, the 29 Special Composite Group complex was inaugurated by the Home Minister Amit Shah at New Town, West Bengal.

Gandhinagar 
In July 2018, NSG operationalized its fifth regional hub at Gandhinagar in Gujarat. Around 100 people will be based for counter-terror and counter-hijack operation.

Amritsar 
NSG proposed Amritsar as a regional hub to improve its counter action capability in Northern India.

Rank structure and designation
Officers

Enlisted ranks

History 

The NSG was established in the wake of 1984 Operation Blue Star, and the high collateral damage to Golden Temple, and civilian and military collateral casualties. Since its founding the NSG has been used in the Punjab in 1986, and Jammu and Kashmir. Some of the NSG's known operations include:
 29–30 April 1986: About 300 NSG commandos and 700 Border Security Force troops stormed the Golden Temple in Operation Black Thunder I. The Temple was cleared and handed over to Punjab Police on 1 May 1986. 300 Sikh militants were captured, and there were no deaths or injuries for either side.
 January 1988: The NSG conducted Op Black Hawk, a heliborne operation in the Mand area of Punjab. In this operation two terrorists were killed and one 7.62mm rifle was recovered. It was a massive operation, says former NSG Director-General Ved Marwah, though it did not get many spectacular results like in Black Thunder.
 12 May 1988: 1,000 NSG commandos (all ranks) surrounded the Golden Temple for yet another assault, in Operation Black Thunder II. Sniper teams armed with Heckler & Koch PSG-1 rifles with night scope took up positions, including atop a 300-foot water tower. While commandos from the 51 SAG divided into assault squadrons, the SRG was used to seal off the area around the temple and for tactical support. In the three-day operation between 15 and 18 May 1988, the NSG cleared the temple. 40 terrorists were killed, and 200 surrendered. In the mid-1990s, a NSG battalion was again deployed in Punjab to confront the Sikh rioters. There they began training the Punjab Police in counter-terrorism.
 5 September – 15 January 1988: Guarding of high-risk terrorist code-named 'Jack'.
 4 August 1989: Operation Mouse Trap in the Tarn Taran district of Punjab, in conjunction with Punjab Police and other security forces. NSG was able to demonstrate that it was possible to achieve area dominance at night, if the strategy and tactics were right. Ved Marwah calls this Operation Night Dominance.
 10 November 1990: NSG task force flown to Kolkata to rescue hostages of a Thai airbus by Burmese students.
 25–26 January 1991: The NSG was involved in Operation Ani Ben, on CI tasks in Baroda, (Gujarat) where Punjab terrorists were holed up inside a house. Two terrorists were killed and two AK-47s were recovered.
 1 July-20 September 1991: NSG employed along with SIT in search and strike missions after the assassination of Rajiv Gandhi.
 25 November – 16 December 1992: 150 commandos were deployed at Ayodhya during the Ram Janambhoomi and Babri Masjid crisis.
 27 March 1993: 52 SAG mobilised and moved to Adampur for rescue of hostages of Indian Airlines Flight IC 486.
 24–25 April 1993: NSG Commandos stormed a hijacked Indian Airlines Boeing 737 with 141 passengers on board at Amritsar airport during Operation Ashwamedh. Two hijackers, including their leader, Mohammed Yousuf Shah, were killed and one was disarmed before any hostages were harmed.
 October 1998: As part of the implementation of the Union Home Ministry's decision to conduct pro-active strikes against militants, commando teams supported by IAF Mi-25/35 helicopter gun-ships began striking at terrorist groups deep inside the mountains and forests of Kashmir. After helicopter reconnaissance was conducted to pinpoint the militants, the commandos – comprising NSG and Rashtriya Rifles personnel – were para-dropped, along with supplies, into the area to hunt the militants. They had to rely on these supplies and their ability to live off the land until replenishment every fortnight or so. These missions are possibly ongoing.
 15 July 1999: NSG commandos ended a 30-hour standoff by killing 2 terrorists and rescuing all 12 hostages unharmed in J&K. The terrorists had attacked a BSF campus near Srinagar, killed 3 officers and the wife of another. The 12 hostages were kept locked in a room.
 21 August 1999: After interrogating three captured terrorists, the Delhi Police Crime branch confirmed that two more terrorists were hiding in a one-storied house in Rudrapur, Uttar Pradesh. Since the terrorists were considered armed and dangerous (their colleagues were arrested with 100+ pounds of RDX), the Delhi Police sought assistance from the NSG. A 16-man team arrived at the house at 4:45 am They began their assault at 5:30 am, before first light. The first militant managed to fire at the commandos with a pistol he kept by his bedside, but was killed an instant later. The second terrorist was shot before he had a chance to fire and died 40 minutes later. No NSG personnel were injured.
 December 1999: Terrorists hijacked Indian Airlines flight IC814 from Nepal, and landed in Amritsar, Punjab. Within minutes of landing, the Crisis Management Group (CMG), which authorised the use of the NSG, was informed. But the CMG wasted precious hours and by the time the go-ahead was issued, it was too late. On the other hand, the NSG team on alert was elsewhere and no other team was raised during the delay. The hijacked plane took off before the NSG reached Amritsar Airport. The plane landed in Kandahar, Afghanistan where one hostage was killed. Finally, the Indian Government agreed to the terrorists' demands to release three jailed terrorists. The hostages were released and the terrorists escaped to Pakistan.
 February 2000: Following the Flight IC 814 fiasco, the Indian Government decided to implement an Air Marshaling programme. At least two NSG operators were to be present on flights over select routes. These operators would be armed with weapons firing lethal, but low-velocity, fragmentation rounds to minimize danger to the passengers and prevent penetration of the aircraft. Another decision taken was to deploy NSG teams permanently at eight sensitive airports around the country, especially those bordering Pakistan and the North East. This decision was to cut short reaction times for the NSG and eliminate hassles involved in flying the teams to the hijack site. It is not known if this plan has been put into action.
 September 2002 – SAG commandos flew to Karnataka, to catch sandalwood smuggler and forest brigand Veerappan, in the wake of the kidnapping of a former minister of the state cabinet, Nagappa. They pulled out after suggesting that intelligence for the operation was inadequate. A small team was left behind to help, the hostage was eventually killed in December 2002.
 October 2002 – Two terrorists attacked the Akshardham temple complex in Gujarat. NSG flew in, delayed by traffic in Delhi. They carried out assaults in which one commando was killed and another one was seriously injured and died after 18 months in a coma. By morning the two terrorists were neutralised and the operation completed successfully.
 December 2002 – Terrorists attacked the Raghunath temple in Jammu. NSG was ready to be flown out but was called back at the last minute.
 26 November 2008 Mumbai attacks – Operation Black Tornado and Operation Cyclone to flush out terrorists & rescue hostages after multiple attacks across Mumbai, India. Major Sandeep Unnikrishnan and Havaldar Gajender Singh Bisht of the Special Action Group were killed in action during the operations. Over 900 rooms were scanned, 8 terrorists killed and over 600 hostages rescued during the operation.
 2013 Hyderabad blasts – Deployed in Hyderabad after the bomb blasts.
 2013 Bangalore Bomb Blast – NSG was deployed in Bangalore after the bomb blast took place in the city.
 2013 Patna bombings – A team of the NSG, which was sent to Patna for post-blasts analysis, said at least three more Improvised Explosive Devices (IEDs) were defused.
 2016 Pathankot attack – An NSG team took part in the operation to neutralise terrorists where Lt. Col. Niranjan lost his life defusing a grenade or IED booby-trapped on the body of a dead terrorist, and 12 other members of the unit were injured. Six terrorists were neutralised in the operation by the NSG, Defence Security Corps and the Garud Commando Force

Selection and training

Selection is demanding and has a drop out rate of about 70–80 percent. Three of their 14 months of training in Manesar, Haryana, are devoted to the basics. Physical fitness training has 26 elements, ranging from a cross-country obstacle course to jumping from heights and across divides and scaling different kinds of terrain. One endurance test involves martial arts, target shooting at the end of an obstacle-ridden cross-country run. This is meant to gauge the candidate's performance under conditions of stress and exhaustion. Those who successfully complete the tests are sent for nine months of advanced training.

Before being inducted into the NSG, aspirants also have to undergo a rigorous psychological test.

The training includes learning to conduct urban counter-terrorism, underwater operations, house intervention, counter-UAV and anti-drone operations, bomb detection and disposal skills, apart from various other specialisations.

United States 

Exercise between NSG and United States Army Special Forces, code named Balanced Iroquois, started on 18 October 2015. This three-week long exercise was preceded by a joint airborne-jump at Aero India 2015.

In February 2018, Green Berets from the 1st Special Forces Command (Airborne) conducted a joint training exercise with the NSG in Kolkata. The Green Berets learnt some urban warfare strategies from the NSG while the NSG learnt about some advanced equipment of the US soldiers. The drill included intervention techniques, training in the Kolkata Metro system and a drill at the Indian Institute of Technology Kharagpur.

In March 2019, the NSG and US 1st Special Forces Group carried joint exercises in Hyderabad.

Germany 
After the 2008 Mumbai attacks, the NSG decided to have a joint exercise with the German GSG 9. In November 2009, a team from NSG visited the GSG 9 headquarters. Joint training exercises between GSG 9 and NSG were subsequently conducted in Manesar.

Equipment 
The National Security Guard utilizes the following equipment:

Small Arms 
 Glock-17 pistol.
 SIG SG 551 assault rifle.
 Beretta AR70/90 Assault rifle.
 Franchi SPAS-15 Combat shotgun.
 TriCa 7.62x39 mm Carbine. 
M249 Light machine gun 
 Heckler & Koch MSG90 sniper rifle.
 Heckler & Koch PSG1 A1 sniper rifle.
IWI Tavor X95 bullpup rifle.
Barrett Model 98B Sniper rifle 
Heckler & Koch MP5 submachine gun.
SIG MPX Submachine gun.
Glock knives.
CornerShot guns.

Drones 

 Black Hornet Nano military micro UAV.
 'Kamikaze', an Indian drone.

Vehicles and transport 

 Remote-Operated Vehicle, which can transport 150 kg of Improvised explosive device and, alternatively, can transport biological, chemical, radiological and nuclear material.
Maruti Suzuki Gypsy
Ford F550 Super Duty tactical ladder truck.
Renault Sherpa Light Armoured Personal Carrier.
 The NSG has access to Indian Air Force transport aircraft.

In popular culture 

A biographical movie named Major is made on Major Sandeep Unnikrishnan who was one of the team commanders of 51 Special Action Group  of NSG and was killed in action (KIA) during the 2008 Mumbai attacks .
State of Siege: Temple Attack is a 2021 Indian Hindi-language film . It is based on the 2002 Akshardham Temple attack and the subsequent operation to kill the perpetrators.
State of Siege: 26/11 is a Zee5 web series presents the 26/11 terror attacks from the viewpoint of NSG.
 NSG soldiers featured in the 2019 thriller film Hotel Mumbai, which is based on the 2008 Mumbai attacks.

See also
 Special Forces of India
 Paramilitary forces of India
 Central Armed Police Forces
 Special Protection Group

References

External links

Non-military counterterrorist organizations
1986 establishments in Delhi
Specialist law enforcement agencies of India
Government agencies established in 1986